Cheviot was a ship launched in Sunderland in 1827. Initially she sailed between London and Quebec. Then in 1831 she became a whaler and sailed to the British Southern Whale Fishery. She never returned to England from that voyage, instead becoming based in Hobart and remaining there as whaler and merchantman. She was lost in March 1854.

Statement of significance

Career
Cheviot first appeared in the Register of Shipping (RS) with Mawson, master, Laing, owner, and trade Sunderland–London.

In 1831 the ownership of Cheviot changed. The new owners lengthened her, and with a new master, sailed her on a whaling voyage to the waters of the Dutch East Indies and Pacific.

Cheviot first appeared in Lloyd's Register (LR) in 1831 with a launch year of 1831, and other incorrect or questionable information. This has led several sources, such as Hackman, astray.

Whaling voyage: Captain Thomas Bateman sailed from England on 7 November 1831. The French whaler Aigle on 23 May 1832 informed Bateman that  had been lost in the Mozambique Channel.

Cheviot sailed through the Gilolo Passage (Laut Halmahera and Gebe Island) into the Pacific on 30 December 1832. She was reported at various times at Oahu, Hobart, Tahiti, and Honolulu. On 3 July 1833  passed on to Cheviot that the whaler  had been lost on the coast of the Seychelles.

Later career: Cheviot did not return to England. She continued whaling through to 1837 when Captain James Kelly registered her in Hobart as her owner. Under his ownership she increasingly spent more time in local trade and less in whaling.

In 1842 Charles Seal and William John Mansfield of Hobart purchased Cheviot. When Seal died in November 1852 his wife Phillis Seal became the owner of Cheviot, and the rest of his fleet. (Another one of the Seal whalers was Aladdin.) Mansfield bought out Seal's share in Cheviot but lost his ownership in 1853 to the mortgagor. He remained her master, however, until she was lost.

Fate
Cheviot was wrecked on 24 March 1854 off Wilson's Promontory in Waterloo Bay. She was on a voyage from Hobart to Melbourne with a cargo of 343 planks, 213 piles, 705 bags lime, 36 trusses hay, and seven boxes. She foundered in a gale while in the Waterloo Bay anchorage.

Citations

References
 
 

1827 ships
Ships built on the River Wear
Age of Sail merchant ships of England
Whaling ships
Maritime incidents in March 1854
Shipwrecks of Victoria (Australia)